The Sprite Tournament was a professional golf tournament played at Selsdon Park Golf Club, Surrey, England in 1959 and 1960. The 1960 event was called the Sprite International.

In the 1959 event the first 36 holes were also played as a pro-am better ball. The 1960 event was preceded by a 27-hole pro-am better-ball event.

Winners

References

Golf tournaments in England
1959 establishments in England
1960 disestablishments in England